Marco Bührer (born 9 October 1979 in Dielsdorf, Switzerland) is a Swiss former professional ice hockey goaltender. He played most of his career for SC Bern in the National League (NL).
 
Bührer was awarded the Jacques Plante Trophy as the league's best goaltender of the 2003–04 season.

References

External links
 

1979 births
Living people
EHC Kloten players
Ice hockey players at the 2006 Winter Olympics
Olympic ice hockey players of Switzerland
People from Dielsdorf District
SC Bern players
Swiss ice hockey goaltenders
Sportspeople from the canton of Zürich